Peters Lake is a lake in Peters Township, a geographic township, in the Unorganized North Part of Sudbury District in northeastern Ontario, Canada. It is in the Lake Superior drainage basin.

There are three inflows, all unnamed, at the south of the lake. The primary outflow, at the north, is an unnamed stream that leads north to Windermere Lake. Windermere Lake flows via the Windermere River, Shikwamkwa Lake, the Shikwamkwa River, Whitefish Lake, and the Michipicoten River to Lake Superior.

References

Lakes of Sudbury District